Blaine Rowe (born 22 March 2002) is an English professional footballer who plays as a defender for  Falkirk, on loan from Coventry City.

Career
A youth product of Coventry City, Rowe signed his first professional contract with the club in the summer of 2020.

On 31 January 2022, Blaine joined Scottish Championship side Ayr United on loan for the remainder of the season. He went on to make his debut for the Scottish club a day later coming on in the 72nd minute for Jordan Houston against Partick Thistle. Despite showing early promise an injury cut his time in Scotland short. He subsequently joined Scottish League One side  Falkirk on 2nd January 2023 on a six month loan.

Career statistics

References

External links

CCFC Profile

2002 births
Living people
English footballers
Coventry City F.C. players
Ayr United F.C. players
Falkirk F.C. players
Scottish Professional Football League players
Association football defenders